Mixin' It Up is the seventh studio album by American soul-disco group, The Trammps, released in 1980 through Atlantic Records.

Commercial performance
The album features the single "Hard Rock and Disco", which peaked at No. 76 on the Hot Dance Club Play chart.

Track listing

Personnel
The Trammps
Earl Young
Harold Wade 
Stanley Wade 
Robert Upchurch 
Jimmy Ellis

Additional Personnel
Norman Harris, T.J. Tindall, Roland Chambers, Bobby Eli – guitars
Ronnie Baker, Vince Fay – bass
Eugene Curry, Cotton Kent, Ron Kersey, Bruce Gray, Lenny Pakula – keyboards
Earl Young – drums
Vincent Montana Jr. – vibraphone
Larry Washington, James Walker, Weldon McDougall – percussion
Don Renaldo & His Strings – strings (except on "Let Me Dance Real Close" strings by Paul Schorr & His Strings)
Reuben Henderson, Harold Watkins, Artie Williams, Joseph Smithers, Jr. – horns (except on "Let Me Dance Real Close" horns by Maurice Spears & His Horns)

References

External links

1980 albums
The Trammps albums
Albums recorded at Sigma Sound Studios
Albums recorded at Total Experience Recording Studios
Atlantic Records albums